Herbert Köfer (17 February 1921 – 24 July 2021) was a German actor, voice artist, and television presenter. He was the first German TV news presenter for the East German Deutscher Fernsehfunk, and also presented the station's last news before the reunification of Germany. His first theatre engagement was in 1940, and he kept acting until the age of 100. Köfer played an SS-Hauptsturmführer in the 1963 film Nackt unter Wölfen (Naked Among Wolves). He was known for detective series such as Polizeiruf 110 and for comic roles. He founded his own troupe, Köfers Komödiantenbühne, in 2003, and published memoirs.

Life 

Herbert Köfer was born in Prenzlauer Berg, Berlin. He went to acting school and started his career in 1940 with first engagements at the theatre in Brieg, Lower Silesia. From 1941 to 1945 Köfer served in the Wehrmacht. He was a prisoner of war; when he returned, he worked in different theatres in Berlin, including the Volksbühne, Deutsches Theater and Kabarett Kleine Bühne.

From 1952, he worked for the East German TV channel Deutscher Fernsehfunk and was on 21 December 1952 the first German TV presenter, moderating Aktuelle Kamera. Köfer was both the presenter of the first moments of East German television and the host of the final show nearly 40 years later on 31 December 1991. Beginning in the late 1950s, he had roles as an actor in films and TV series. He also became part of the cabaret .

In Nackt unter Wölfen (Naked Among Wolves), he played the role of SS-Hauptsturmführer Kluttig. He was known for detective series such as Polizeiruf 110 and for comic roles. He was popular as Opa Paul Schmidt in the TV series Rentner haben niemals Zeit (Senior citizens never have time). 

After the reunification of Germany, he continued his career. In 2003 he founded his stage show Köfers Komödiantenbühne. In March 2008 he published his biography Nie war es so verrückt wie immer … (It is never as crazy as always).

Köfer lived in the Potsdam-Mittelmark district near the Seddiner See. From 2000 until his death, he was in his third marriage with actress Heike Köfer. His daughters Mirjam Köfer and Geertje Boeden from his second marriage to actress Ute Boeden are also actresses. His son Andreas Köfer from his first marriage is a cinematographer. He also had a foster daughter. Köfer turned 100 in February 2021, and died in Berlin five months later.

Films 

Films with Köfer include:

 1951: Die Sonnenbrucks
 1953: Anna Susanna
 1956: Der Teufelskreis
 1957: Mazurka der Liebe
 1959: Maibowle (The Punch Bowl)
 1959: Reportage 57
 1960: Die schöne Lurette
 1963: Reserviert für den Tod (Reserved for the Death)
 1963: Nackt unter Wölfen (Naked Among Wolves)
 1964: Schwarzer Samt

 1964: 
 1965: Der Reserveheld
 1965: Denk bloß nicht, ich heule

 1965: Hände hoch oder ich schieße (Hands Up or I'll Shoot)

 1967: Hochzeitsnacht im Regen
 1967: Ein Lord am Alexanderplatz
 1967: Frau Venus und ihr Teufel
 1968: Hauptmann Florian von der Mühle

 1969: Jungfer, Sie gefällt mir
 1970: Jeder stirbt für sich allein (three mini series)
 1971: KLK an PTX – Die Rote Kapelle (KLK Calling PTZ – The Red Orchestra)

 1972: Tecumseh
 1972: Walter Defends Sarajevo (Валтер брани Сарајево)

 1973: Polizeiruf 110: Nachttresor (TV series, thenfrequently)

 1974: 

 1978: Rentner haben niemals Zeit, as Opa Paul Schmidt (TV series)

 1982: Geschichten übern Gartenzaun (TV series)
 1984–1986: Familie Neumann / Neumanns Geschichten (TV series)

 1993: Auto Fritze: Weiberwirtschaft
 1993: Immer wieder Sonntag: Das neue Haus

 1994: Elbflorenz (TV series)

 1997: Dr. Sommerfeld – Neues vom Bülowbogen: Der neue Doktor (TV series)

 2000: Wolffs Revier: Wolffs Falle (TV series)
 2001–2021: In aller Freundschaft (TV series, four episodes)
 2002: Unser Charly: Rufmord (TV series)

 2005: SOKO Wismar: Schöne Aussicht (TV series)

 2006: Leipzig Homicide: Katzenfutter (TV series)
 2007: Allein unter Bauern: Der alte Mann und das Gewehr
 2007: Ein starkes Team: Blutige Ernte (TV series)
 2008: KDD – Kriminaldauerdienst: Im Zwielicht (TV series)
 2010: Notruf Hafenkante: Alte Freunde (TV series)
 2012: 
 2012: Heiter bis tödlich: Akte Ex: Endlich Prinzessin (TV series)
 2014: Leipzig Homicide: Letzte Wahrheit (TV series)
 2021: Krauses Zukunft (TV film)

Theatre 

 1946: Schiller's Die Braut von Messina, as Don Cesar, Neues Berliner Künstlertheater Kleinmachnow

 1951: Shakespeare's Was ihr wollt, Deutsches Theater Berlin
 1952: Shakespeare's Die Komödie der Irrungen, Brandenburgisches Landestheater Potsdam

 1997: Die Feuerzangenbowle, as Schnauz, Comödie Dresden
 1997: Im weißen Rössl, as Wilhelm Gieseke, Comödie Dresden
 2010: Ritter Ludwig, title role, Comödie Dresden

Publications 

 Das war's noch lange nicht. Erinnerungen. Ullstein, Berlin 1995, .
 Nie war es so verrückt wie immer… Das Neue Berlin, Berlin 2008, .
 99 und kein bisschen leise,  2019, .

Awards 

 1964: Heinrich Greif Prize

 1969: Nationalpreis der DDR, I. Klasse for Krupp und Krause / Krause und Krupp
 1977: Vaterländischer Verdienstorden in bronze
 1979: Vaterländischer Verdienstorden in gold

  (shared)
 2002: , for lifetime achievements

References

Further reading 

 F.-B. Habel: Lexikon. Schauspieler in der DDR. Verlag Neues Leben, Berlin 2009, S. 220/222, .

External links 

 
 
 Herbert Köfer at film-zeit.de

1921 births
2021 deaths
East German actors
East German television personalities
German centenarians
German male actors
German male voice actors
German television presenters
German radio presenters
Men centenarians
Male actors from Berlin
Recipients of the Patriotic Order of Merit
Recipients of the National Prize of East Germany
German Army personnel of World War II
German prisoners of war in World War II